Arthur Vanderstuyft (23 December 1883 – 6 May 1956) was a Belgian cyclist. He competed in motor-paced racing in the professionals category and won three medals at the world championships in 1904, 1906 and 1908.

As a road cyclist he competed in ten six-day races and twice finished in second place: in 1904 in New York and in 1912 in Brussels. His father Fritz and younger brother Léon were also professional cyclists.

References

1883 births
1956 deaths
Belgian male cyclists
Cyclists from Antwerp Province
People from Essen, Belgium